</noinclude>

Love in a Cold Climate is a British serial drama miniseries produced by the BBC in association with WGBH Boston, and first broadcast in two parts on BBC One on 4 and 11 February 2001. The series was adapted by Deborah Moggach from Nancy Mitford's novels The Pursuit of Love (1945) and Love in a Cold Climate (1949), and was directed by Tom Hooper.

It stars Rosamund Pike as Fanny, Elisabeth Dermot Walsh as Linda, Megan Dodds as Polly, Alan Bates as Uncle Matthew, and Celia Imrie as Aunt Sadie. The production staff researched the background to Mitford's novels by interviewing her surviving sister Deborah. The series was accompanied by an Omnibus profile of Mitford and a documentary series entitled The Mitford World on BBC Knowledge.

Love in a Cold Climate was nominated for two British Academy Television Awards; Bates was nominated for Best Actor, and the production team received nominations in the Costume Design and Production Design categories.

An earlier adaptation of Love in a Cold Climate was broadcast in eight episodes in 1980, starring Judi Dench, Michael Aldridge, and Vivian Pickles.

Cast
Rosamund Pike as Fanny
Elisabeth Dermot Walsh as Linda
Megan Dodds as Polly
Alan Bates as Uncle Matthew
Javier Alcina as Juan
Celia Imrie as Aunt Sadie
Anthony Andrews as Boy
John Wood as Lord Merlin
Sheila Gish as Lady Montdore
John Standing as Lord Montdore
Jemima Rooper as Jassy
John Light as Christian

References

External links 

2000s American television miniseries
BBC television dramas
2000s British television miniseries
Television series by WGBH
Television shows based on British novels
2001 British television series debuts
2001 British television series endings
2001 American television series debuts
2001 American television series endings
Works by Tom Hooper